The France women's ice hockey league or the FFHG Féminin Élite ('FFHG Elite Women') is the top level of women's ice hockey in France. The league is organized by the Fédération Française de Hockey sur Glace (FFHG). The competition began in 1987. In some years, a second-level competition, the Excellence Division, has been held.

Format  
The twelve teams in the league are divided into two divisions, North and South. During the regular season, each team plays each of the others in their division twice (once at home and once away), with 3 points being awarded for a win in regulation time, 2 points for a win in overtime or shootouts, 1 point for an overtime/shootout loss, and 0 points for a regulation time loss. The overtime period lasts 5 minutes, and is played 3 vs. 3 sudden-death. The regular season usually takes place from September to March.

The top two teams from each division then go on to play in a three-game playoff tournament (facing each other team once) in a pre-selected host city. The team that finishes with the most points in the playoff tournament is crowned league champions. The playoff tournament usually takes place at the end of March.

Current clubs (2021–22)

Champions

 1986–87 : CSG Grenoble
 1987–88 : CSG Grenoble
 1988–89 : Gap HC
 1989–90 : CSG Saint-Ouen
 1990–91 : HC Cergy-Pontoise
 1991–92 : HC Cergy-Pontoise
 1992–93 : HC Cergy-Pontoise
 1993–94 : HC Cergy-Pontoise
 1994–95 : Club des Patineurs Lyonnais
 1995–96 : HC Cergy-Pontoise
 1996–97 : HC Cergy-Pontoise
 1997–98 : HC Cergy-Pontoise
 1998–99 : Lyon Hockey Club
 1999–2000 : HC Cergy-Pontoise
 2000–01 : HC Cergy-Pontoise
 2001–02 : HC Cergy-Pontoise
 2002–03 : HC Cergy-Pontoise
 2003–04 : HC Cergy-Pontoise
 2004–05 : HC Cergy-Pontoise
 2005–06 : HC Cergy-Pontoise
 2006–07 : HC Cergy-Pontoise
 2007–08 : HC Cergy-Pontoise
 2008–09 : HC Cergy-Pontoise
 2009–10 : Grenoble Métropole Hockey 38
 2010–11 : Grenoble Métropole Hockey 38
 2011–12 : Grenoble Métropole Hockey 38
 2012–13 : HC Cergy-Pontoise
 2013–14 : Bisons de Neuilly-sur-Marne
 2014–15 : Bisons de Neuilly-sur-Marne
 2015–16 : Bisons de Neuilly-sur-Marne
 2016–17 : HC Cergy-Pontoise  
 2017-18 : Aigles de Besançon
 2018-19 : Remparts de Tours
 2019-20 : Not awarded due to COVID-19 pandemic in France

Sources: FFHG, Hockey Archives

Excellence Division Champions
 1999–2000 : HC Caen
 2000–01 : HC Amiens Somme
 2008–09 : Bretagne 
 2009–10 : Bretagne
 2010–11 : Gap Hockey Club
 2011–12 : HC Cergy-Pontoise
 2012–13 : HC Cergy-Pontoise
 2013–14 : HC Cergy-Pontoise

References

External links
 List of champions  on hockeyfrance.com

Women
Women's ice hockey leagues in Europe
Women's sports leagues in France